Doug Locke is an American singer, songwriter, actor, model and host. As a recording artist, he is also sometimes known mononymously as Locke. Locke was born in Houston, Texas to Gene and Aubrey Locke.

Early life and education 
Locke is the son of former Houston City Attorney and Commissioner Gene Locke and Aubrey Locke. He is one of five children, including actress Tembi Locke and writer Attica Locke. His uncle is Olympic Gold medalist Frederick Newhouse.

Locke developed an interest in the performing arts at an early age. He participated in theatre and dance summer camps throughout his childhood. After high school, Locke moved to Los Angeles where he earned a bachelor's degree in Theater Arts from Occidental College. While studying theatre, Locke appeared in multiple productions including: The Crucible, Blues for Alabama Sky, The Pajama Game and She Stoops to Conquer.

During his time at Occidental College, Locke began performing at open mic events and talent showcases. He began to garner a following based on his elaborate stage shows the featured choreography, wardrobe changes, provocative themes and even once a burning guitar.

Career 
Locke was inspired to enter the entertainment industry professionally by the work of his sisters, Tembi Locke (actress) and Attica Locke (writer). He began his career in film and television when he portrayed a young Jimi Hendrix in the Silver Lake Film Festival award-winning short, "A Technicolor Dream". In addition to numerous commercials, pilots and shorts, he most recently appeared in episodes of the hit television shows, House M.D., Bones, Shameless, and the Gareth Emery produced web series "We are CVNT5" created by Garreth Emery. He has appeared in international campaigns for Coca-Cola, Pepsi, Bacardi, Subaru, Contiki, Mercedes Benz, and others. Locke has cameo roles in the horror film Excess Flesh, the hit series Jane The Virgin and the Hallie Meyers-Shyer film Home Again, starring Reese Witherspoon.  He makes a cameo appearance as "Perry" the Icy Receptionist in his sister's series From Scratch.

In 2015, Locke released his debut EP “Blue Heart” featuring #ThisCouldBeUs as the lead single. His musical influences include Prince, Jimi Hendrix, Lenny Kravitz, Rihanna, Beyoncé and Madonna. His work has been featured in The Huffington Post, Out Magazine,  Idolator, GLAAD, AFROPUNK, Logo's NewNowNext, Upworthy.com, PopMatters.com, Blurred Culture and many others.

The single “#ThisCouldBeUs” hit no.32 on the iTunes Hot 100 chart (Barbados) and the music video went viral and has more than 1.3 million views to date. The video was embraced by the LGBT community for its touching portrayal of unrequited love, and was featured in the 2015 Massimadi film festival in Montréal.  The music video for “KING” (the second single from the “Blue Heart” EP) was released on May 4, 2015 to coincide with National Anti-Bullying Day and premiered on Idolator.com.  His third single "Rendezvous" featuring Kaleena Zanders premiered on January 24, 2016 on the popular site, Afropunk.

“Blue Heart” sports a collection of Electric Pop, Funk Rock, and R&B Soul inspired songs tackling themes of love, sex and empowerment written by Locke and Producer Eric McNeely. In addition to playing shows all over Los Angeles (including The Hotel Café and Club Moscow), Locke recently headlined Portland Pride. In November 2017, Locke opened for Gavin Turek as support for her "Good Look For You" tour stop at The Roxy in Los Angeles.  He has appeared on kCal/CBS Morning Show in Los Angeles and Great Day Houston.

His concert film, Locke: Live at Club Moscow, premiered in Los Angeles at El Cid on February 22, 2016 and can be seen on YouTube. On October 26, 2018, Locke released the song "In or Out."  The music video has a vampire theme inspired by the 1980s horror cult classic film, The Lost Boys, and premiered with Out magazine.  The video was nominated in the "Best Indie Music Video" category of the 2018 Queerty Awards (The Queerties).

Locke released his Black Travolta EP on May 8, 2020.  This is the first in a series of three EPs known collectively as the Lunar Series.  "Black Travolta" includes country, disco, pop and hip hop influences.  According to American Songwriter magazine, "For his new single “Black Travolta” however, Los Angeles-based artist Doug Locke didn’t merely sew a recognizable hook into an original song… he wove a total banger. Needling that iconic and unmistakable melodic funk riff from The Bee Gees’ disco hit “Stayin’ Alive” into an ecstasy-fueled Ennio Morricone soundtrack, “Black Travolta” turns up the disco bassline in this Spaghetti Western theme song to Full Throb.". The second EP in the series, Why? (Lunar II), was released on June 26, 2020.  The music video for "Why?" premiered on September 24, 2020 with Substream Magazine and was featured by Billboard, Stitched Sound, The Hype Magazine. and more.

On April 3, 2022, Locke played a live show at Los Angeles' famed Harvard & Stone and live premiered a few new songs from his forthcoming album Phoenix.

Locke headlined a sold out show at the Viper Room on Los Angeles' Sunset Strip on November 19, 2022.

Discography 
 Blue Heart (EP) (2015)
In or Out (Single) (2018)
Black Travolta - Lunar I (EP) (2020)
Why? - Lunar II (EP) 2020

References

External links 
 Official Website
 

Year of birth missing (living people)
Living people
African-American male actors
American gay musicians
American LGBT singers
Musicians from Houston
Male actors from Houston
21st-century African-American male singers
African-American male models
African-American songwriters
21st-century LGBT people
American male singer-songwriters
Singer-songwriters from Texas